Allolepis is a genus of North American plants in the grass family.

The only known species is Texas false saltgrass, Allolepis texana, native to western Texas and northern Mexico (Chihuahua, Coahuila, Durango, Tamaulipas).

All of the known US populations are staminate (male), lacking female flowers, reproducing vegetatively. The species grows on sandy and silty soils of river bottoms and floodplains.

Allolepis texana is similar to Distichlis spp. It is a dioecious, perennial herb reproducing by means of stolons running along the surface of the ground. Staminate plants have up to 20 flowers per spikelet, pistillate plants only 5–9.

See also 
 List of Poaceae genera

References 

Chloridoideae
Grasses of Mexico
Native grasses of Texas
Flora of Northeastern Mexico
Monotypic Poaceae genera
Dioecious plants